Edward Peter Cowan Holmes (25 April 1880 – 24 April 1924) was an Irish field hockey player who competed in the 1908 Summer Olympics. In 1908 he represented the United Kingdom of Great Britain and Ireland as a member of the Irish national team, which won the silver medal. He was born in Carrickfergus.

References

External links
 
Olympic profile

1880 births
1924 deaths
Place of death missing
Members of the Ireland hockey team at the 1908 Summer Olympics
Irish male field hockey players
Medalists at the 1908 Summer Olympics
Olympic silver medallists for Great Britain
Ireland international men's field hockey players